Ian John Bastow (born 12 August 1971) is an English former professional football midfielder who played for Torquay United.

References

1971 births
Living people
Sportspeople from Torquay
English footballers
Torquay United F.C. players
Taunton Town F.C. players
Dawlish United F.C. players
Association football midfielders